Second Life Syndrome is the second full-length album by progressive rock band Riverside, released on 31 October 2005.

This second release garnered quite as much praise as Out of Myself and was released on the large prog rock label Inside Out Music. Second Life Syndrome has a noticeably more raw and heavy feel than Out of Myself which in general was much more laid back and mellow. The title track has been said in one radio interview to be one of the best songs to sum up Riverside's sound. The song contains three parts: A slightly aggressive first part, a mellow and quiet second part, and an instrumental third part. This album is the second part of the Reality Dream trilogy which would explain the first and last track's titles; Second Life Syndrome comes after Out of Myself but before Rapid Eye Movement.

As of March 2009, the album is #43 on Metal Storm's Top 100 albums of all-time list.
Former Dream Theater drummer Mike Portnoy named Second Life Syndrome one of his favourite albums of 2005.

Track listing

Personnel 
Riverside
 Mariusz Duda – vocals, bass
Piotr Grudziński – guitar
 Michał Łapaj – keyboards
 Piotr Kozieradzki – drums

Production
 Produced By Riverside, Magda & Robert Srzedniccy
 Recorded, Engineered & Mixed By Magda & Robert Srzedniccy
 Mastered By Jacek Gawłowski

Charts

References

2005 albums
Concept albums
Riverside (band) albums
Inside Out Music albums